, also known as  or MPB, was a franchise of Playboy magazine in Japan.

History and profile
Monthly Playboy was first published in July 1975. Influenced by the sophisticated designs and contents of Monthly Playboy, a number of magazines were launched to imitate it.
However, this was a magazine that translated and re-edited Playboy published in the United States for the Japanese market. As such, it is essentially unrelated to Weekly Playboy. Kazuhiko Torishima, known for bringing Dragon Ball creator Akira Toriyama to the world, commented as follows.
"Monthly Playboy was an interesting magazine with cutting-edge contents that attracted relatively young readers in their 20s and 30s, rather than older, and it also had a good advertising strategy".  The magazine ceased publication with the final January 2009 issue, due to a decline in readership.

Pop artist Keiichi Tanaami was the magazine's first art director.

Mika Okuda 

Mika Okuda, one of the 1988 Playmates, was an original member of Onyanko Club, the biggest female idol group of the 1980s, and was membership number 1. However, only two weeks after the group was launched in April 1985, she was photographed by the weekly magazine Shūkan Bunshun smoking in a coffee shop with five other members. This scandal led to Okuda's dismissal from Onyanko Club. She had dropped her high school credits in March 1985. Therefore, she had to start her second grade all over again in April (schools in Japan start a new grade in April). She admitted that there was a time when she was a delinquent girl before becoming a member of Onyanko Club. She had a part-time job at the amusement park Toshimaen during the summer vacation of the year she was fired. after starting the second trimester in September, she worked another part-time job after school. In August 1986, she even appeared in the photo magazine .This magazine was published by Bungeishunjū, the same company that publishes Shūkan Bunshun, the magazine that forced her to be fired. She also applied for the idol group audition organized by the manga magazine Weekly Young Magazine. However, she was not selected. Her nudity was revealed in the October 1988 issue of Monthly Playboy for the first time after she was named runner-up in Playmate Japan 88.

Playmate Japan (1986–1993)

 1986 - , Emi Satō, Reiko Sugano
 1987 - Minako Konno
 1988 - , Mari Kokubu, Mika Okuda
 1989 - 
 1990 - Kurisu Aoki, Akio Horisaka, Sachiko Kurachi, Haruka Morimura, Madoka Sugawara, Rie Sugimoto
 1991 - Misuteriasu K
 1992 - Kana Aiba, Reira Misaki, Chise Tokuda

See also
Weekly Playboy

References

External links
 Monthly Playboy
 Japanese Playboy Covers at PBCovers.com

1975 establishments in Japan
2009 disestablishments in Japan
Defunct magazines published in Japan
Men's magazines published in Japan
Monthly magazines published in Japan
Magazines established in 1975
Magazines disestablished in 2009
Playboy magazines